The Southwest Conference Men's Basketball Player of the Year was an annual basketball award given to the Southwest Conference (SWC)'s most outstanding player. The award was first given following the 1957–58 season and concluded after the 1995–96 season (the SWC disbanded with four members establishing the Big 12 Conference, three members joining the Western Athletic Conference, and one joining Conference USA).

Key

Winners

Winners by school

References

NCAA Division I men's basketball conference players of the year
Player Of The Year
Awards established in 1958
Awards disestablished in 1996